Rufus McLean (born 2 March 2000) is a Scotland international rugby union player. He played for Glasgow Warriors in the United Rugby Championship until his contract was terminated on the 24th of January 2023 following McLean’s guilty plea to charges of domestic violence. McLean's primary position is wing or fullback. Whilst at Merchiston Castle School he played every position from 9 to 15.

Rugby Union career

Professional career

McLean signed his first professional contract for Glasgow Warriors in June 2020. He made his debut for Glasgow Warriors in the re-arranged Round 9 of the 2020–21 Pro14 against .  He won the Warriors 'Try of the Season' award for 2020/21 for a try against Dragons at the Principality Stadium.

International career

McLean has been capped at Scotland U18s and Scotland U20s scoring 4 tries in 6 appearances for the latter.

McLean received his first call up to the senior Scotland squad in March 2021 for the 2021 Six Nations Championship.

He made his Scotland debut against Tonga on 30 October 2021. Scotland won the match 60 - 14, with McLean scoring 2 tries.

He was capped by Scotland 'A' on 25 June 2022 in their match against Chile.

International tries

 As of 30 October 2021

External links
itsrugby.co.uk Profile

References

2000 births
Living people
Sportspeople from Boston
Glasgow Warriors players
Rugby union wings
Rugby union fullbacks
Scotland international rugby union players
Scottish rugby union players
Scotland 'A' international rugby union players
People educated at Merchiston Castle School
Alumni of the University of Strathclyde